The Lebanese Third Division is the third division of Lebanese football, and is controlled by the Lebanese Football Association.

The 24 teams are divided into four groups of seven teams each; the first two teams of each group qualify to the playoffs and the first two teams of these playoffs qualify to the Lebanese Second Division and replace the relegated teams. On the other hand, the last two teams will be submitted to the playoffs that will decide which two of these four teams will be relegated to the Lebanese Fourth Division.

Clubs

Champions

2020–21 season

Group A
 Homenmen
 Homenetmen
 Ittihad Haret Naameh
 Nojoom Beirut
 Shabab Majdal Anjar
 Wahda Marj
 Zamalek Beirut

Group B
 Ahli Sarba
 Hilal Haret Naameh
 Irshad Chehim
 Raya
 Salam Sour
 Sharq
 Taqadom Anqoun

Group C
 Amal Maaraka
 Bint Jbeil
 Harouf
 Nahda Ain Baal
 Okhwa Kharayeb
 Sporting Qlaileh
 Riyadi Abbasiya

Group D
 Ashbal Mina
 Amal Salam Zgharta
 Ansar Mawadda
 Mahabbe Tripoli
 Majd Tripoli
 Riada Wal Adab
 Shabab Tripoli

References

 
3
Sports leagues established in 1950
1950 establishments in Lebanon